Luxton Lake, previously known as Lucky Lake, is located 2 hours from New York City in Narrowsburg, New York.  The development was a popular vacation spot for African American New Yorkers in the 1950s and 1960s.

References

Lakes of New York (state)
Lakes of Sullivan County, New York